The Canadian Human Rights Act is a statute passed by the Parliament of Canada in 1977 with the express goal of extending the law to ensure equal opportunity to individuals who may be victims of discriminatory practices based on a set of prohibited grounds.

The prohibited grounds currently are:  race, national or ethnic origin, colour, religion, age, sex, sexual orientation, gender identity or expression, marital status, family status, genetic characteristics, disability,  and conviction for an offence for which a pardon has been granted or in respect of which a record suspension has been ordered.

Application 
The act applies throughout Canada, but only to federally regulated activities; each province and territory has its own anti-discrimination law that applies to activities that are not federally regulated.

The Canadian Human Rights Act created the Canadian Human Rights Commission that investigates claims of discrimination as well as the Canadian Human Rights Tribunal to judge the cases.

Before a case can be brought to the Tribunal it must go through several stages of investigation and remediation by the Commission. After this process has been completed, if the parties are not satisfied, the case will go to the tribunal.

If a complainant can show a valid case of discrimination the defendant can rebuke it by showing that their practice was for a justified reason. The process is generally known as the "Meiorin test" which is similar to the Oakes test justification in a Charter challenge.

In June 2018, the Supreme Court of Canada found that the Canadian Human Rights Tribunal's determination that the Indian Act did not violate the Canadian Human Rights Act was reasonable due to judicial deference.

Specific provisions

Gender identity and expression
In 2016, the government of Prime Minister Justin Trudeau introduced An Act to amend the Canadian Human Rights Act and the Criminal Code (C-16) in the House of Commons of Canada, to add and include "gender identity or expression" to the legislation. The bill passed the Commons on November 18, 2016, and the Senate on June 15, 2017.  It received royal assent on June 19, 2017. The law went into effect immediately.

Hate messages 

The Canadian Human Rights Act formerly had a provision, section 13, dealing with communication of hate messages. The provision was repealed by the Parliament of Canada in June 2013, with the repeal coming into force one year later.

See also
 List of anti-discrimination acts
 Human rights in Canada
 Human rights complaints against Maclean's magazine
 Censorship in Canada
 Hate speech laws in Canada
 Canadian Charter of Rights and Freedoms
 Canadian Bill of Rights
 Canadian Human Rights Commission
 Employment equity (Canada)
 Equal pay for women
 Veterans' Bill of Rights
 Ontario Human Rights Code
 Quebec Charter of Human Rights and Freedoms

References

External links
  Canadian Human Rights Act (full text)
 Canadian Human Rights Commission
 Canadian Human Rights Tribunal
 Maple Leaf Web: The Canadian Human Rights Act: Introduction to Canada’s Federal Human Rights Legislation

Canadian federal legislation
Labour relations in Canada
Labour legislation of Canada
National human rights instruments
1977 in Canadian law
Human rights legislation in Canada
Anti-discrimination law in Canada